Beechworth railway station is a closed station on the closed Yackandandah line in Victoria (Australia). 
Although the tracks to Beechworth have been removed, the station building, platform and goods shed all remain in a good condition. The station building is used as a youth centre while the rail trail runs through the middle of the station grounds. 

Disused railway stations in Victoria (Australia)